William Baldwin (died June 22, 1895) was an American politician from Maryland. He served as a member of the Maryland House of Delegates, representing Harford County from 1870 to 1872.

Early life
William Baldwin was born in Harford County, Maryland.

Career
Baldwin was a Democrat. He served as a member of the Maryland House of Delegates, representing Harford County from 1870 to 1872.

Baldwin was president of the Harford Agricultural Association for five years. He was a director of the Harford Mutual Fire Insurance Company.

Personal life
Baldwin married Miss Powell. She died around 1881. They had one son, Silas.

Baldwin died on June 22, 1895, at the age of 79, at Upper Cross Roads in Harford County.

References

Year of birth uncertain
1810s births
1895 deaths
People from Harford County, Maryland
Democratic Party members of the Maryland House of Delegates